The 2023 Canadian Wheelchair Curling Championship will be held from March 20 to 24 at the Moose Jaw Ford Curling Centre in Moose Jaw, Saskatchewan. This is the first time the championship will be held since 2019 as it was cancelled due to the COVID-19 pandemic in 2020, 2021 and 2022.

Teams
The teams are listed as follows:

Round robin standings

Round robin results
All draws are listed in Central Time (UTC−05:00).

Draw 1
Monday, March 20, 2:00 pm

Draw 2
Monday, March 20, 7:00 pm

Draw 3
Tuesday, March 21, 2:00 pm

Draw 4
Tuesday, March 21, 7:00 pm

Draw 5
Wednesday, March 22, 2:00 pm

Seeding pool

Standings

Results

Draw 6
Wednesday, March 22, 7:00 pm

Draw 7
Thursday, March 23, 2:00 pm

Draw 8
Thursday, March 23, 7:00 pm

Championship pool

Standings

Results

Draw 6
Wednesday, March 22, 7:00 pm

Draw 7
Thursday, March 23, 2:00 pm

Draw 8
Thursday, March 23, 7:00 pm

Playoffs

Semifinal
Friday, March 24, 9:00 am

Final
Friday, March 24, 1:30 pm

Final standings

References

External links

Canadian Wheelchair Curling Championships
Curling in Saskatchewan
March 2023 sports events in Canada
Sport in Moose Jaw
Canadian Wheelchair Curling Championship
Canadian Wheelchair Curling Championship